Vitali Aleksandrovich Yachmenev (born January 8, 1975) is a Russian former professional ice hockey left wing. He was drafted in the third round, 59th overall, by the Los Angeles Kings in the 1994 NHL Entry Draft.

Playing career
Drafted from the Ontario Hockey League's North Bay Centennials, Yachmenev made his National Hockey League (NHL) debut during 1995–96 season with the Kings, appearing in 80 games and scoring 19 goals. After two full seasons and part of a third with the Kings, Yachmenev was traded to the Nashville Predators before the 1998–99 season, the team's inaugural season. He played five full seasons with the Predators before returning to Russia. He has played in the Russian Hockey Super League since 2003–04, and joined team, HC Dynamo Moscow, in 2007–08. In 2008-09, he was team captain of Dynamo Moscow in the KHL. Two years later, in 2010-11, Vitali played with his hometown with Traktor Chelyabinsk. It would prove to be his last year in the KHL.

In his last two seasons, Yachmenev played for Rubin Tyumen in the Supreme Hockey League. In his NHL career, he appeared in 487 games, tallying 83 goals and 133 assists.

Awards
 Emms Family Award (top first-year player in Ontario Hockey League): 1993–94 season
 CHL Rookie of the Year (most outstanding rookie in Canadian Hockey League): 1993–94 season
 William Hanley Trophy (most sportsmanlike player in Ontario Hockey League): 1994–95 season

Career statistics

Regular season and playoffs

International

External links

1975 births
Avangard Omsk players
Ak Bars Kazan players
Amur Khabarovsk players
HC Dynamo Moscow players
Living people
Long Beach Ice Dogs (IHL) players
Los Angeles Kings draft picks
Los Angeles Kings players
Milwaukee Admirals (IHL) players
Nashville Predators players
North Bay Centennials players
Phoenix Roadrunners (IHL) players
Russian ice hockey right wingers
Sportspeople from Chelyabinsk